Bjørn Berland (born 14 April 1977) is a retired Norwegian footballer.

Club career
His career began in Sandved IL and then Ulf-Sandnes and joined Viking FK in 1997. He played 153 Norwegian Premier games from 1997 to 2005. In late 2005 he signed for Sandefjord Fotball, but instead retired two days later.

International career
Berland never managed to play for Norway's senior team, but he played 5 matches for the U-21 team, making his debut in 1998 against Denmark U-21.

References

1977 births
Living people
People from Sandnes
Norwegian footballers
Sandved IL players
Sandnes Ulf players
Viking FK players
Association football forwards
Sportspeople from Rogaland